The qualification process of men's teams for the 2009 Rugby World Cup Sevens. Automatic qualification was extended to the host and the eight quarterfinalists of the previous World Cup. The remaining spots were contested in each of the six regions' respective tournaments.

Qualified teams

Qualifying

Africa

Group A
{| class="wikitable" style="text-align: center;"
|-
!width="200"|Team
!width="40"|Pld
!width="40"|W
!width="40"|D
!width="40"|L
!width="40"|PF
!width="40"|PA
!width="40"|+/-
!width="40"|Pts
|-
|- align=center bgcolor="#98fb98" 
|align=left| 
|3||3||0||0||88||33||+55||9
|-
|- align=center bgcolor="#98fb98"
|align=left| 
|3||2||0||1||67||55||+12||7
|-
|- bgcolor=#ccccff
|align=left| 
|3||1||0||2||57||58||-1||5
|-
|- bgcolor=#ccccff
|align=left| 
|3||0||0||3||24||90||-66||3
|}

Group B
{| class="wikitable" style="text-align: center;"
|-
!width="200"|Team
!width="40"|Pld
!width="40"|W
!width="40"|D
!width="40"|L
!width="40"|PF
!width="40"|PA
!width="40"|+/-
!width="40"|Pts
|-
|- align=center bgcolor="#98fb98" 
|align=left| 
|4||4||0||0||86||19||+67||12
|-
|- align=center bgcolor="#98fb98"
|align=left| 
|4||3||0||1||71||36||+35||10
|-
|- bgcolor=#ccccff
|align=left| 
|4||2||0||2||50||39||+11||8
|-
|- bgcolor=#ccccff
|align=left| 
|4||0||1||3||51||71||-20||5
|-
|- bgcolor="#ffcccc"
|align=left| 
|4||0||1||3||31||97||-66||5
|}

Plate

Cup

North America And West Indies

Group A

{| class="wikitable" style="text-align: center;"
|-
!width="200"|Team
!width="40"|Pld
!width="40"|W
!width="40"|D
!width="40"|L
!width="40"|PF
!width="40"|PA
!width="40"|+/-
!width="40"|Pts
|- 
|- align=center bgcolor="#98fb98"
|style="text-align:left;"|
|2||2||0||0||83||0||+83||6
|-
|- align=center bgcolor="#98fb98"
|style="text-align:left;"|
|2||1||0||1||10||36||-26||4
|- 
|- bgcolor="#ccccff"
|style="text-align:left;"|
|2||0||0||2||5||62||-57||2
|- 
|}

Group B
{| class="wikitable" style="text-align: center;"
|-
!width="200"|Team
!width="40"|Pld
!width="40"|W
!width="40"|D
!width="40"|L
!width="40"|PF
!width="40"|PA
!width="40"|+/-
!width="40"|Pts
|-
|- align=center bgcolor="#98fb98"  
|align=left| 
|2||2||0||0||74||0||+74||6
|-
|- align=center bgcolor="#98fb98" 
|align=left|  
|2||1||0||1||12||26||-14||4
|-
|- bgcolor=#ccccff
|align=left| 
|2||0||0||2||0||60||-60||2
|}

Group C
{| class="wikitable" style="text-align: center;"
|-
!width="200"|Team
!width="40"|Pld
!width="40"|W
!width="40"|D
!width="40"|L
!width="40"|PF
!width="40"|PA
!width="40"|+/-
!width="40"|Pts
|-
|- align=center bgcolor="#98fb98"  
|align=left| 
|2||2||0||0||44||0||+44||6
|-
|- align=center bgcolor="#98fb98" 
|align=left|  
|2||1||0||1||27||10||-17||4
|-
|- bgcolor=#ccccff
|align=left| 
|2||0||0||2||0||61||-61||2
|}

Plate

{| class="wikitable" style="text-align: center;"
|-
!width="200"|Team
!width="40"|Pld
!width="40"|W
!width="40"|D
!width="40"|L
!width="40"|PF
!width="40"|PA
!width="40"|+/-
!width="40"|Pts
|- 
|- align=center bgcolor="#98fb98"
|style="text-align:left;"|
|2||2||0||0||36||10||+26||6
|-
|- bgcolor="#ccccff"
|style="text-align:left;"|
|2||1||0||1||10||17||-7||4
|- 
|- bgcolor="#ffcccc"
|style="text-align:left;"|
|2||0||0||2||5||24||-19||2
|- 
|}

Cup Group stage

Group A

{| class="wikitable" style="text-align: center;"
|-
!width="200"|Team
!width="40"|Pld
!width="40"|W
!width="40"|D
!width="40"|L
!width="40"|PF
!width="40"|PA
!width="40"|+/-
!width="40"|Pts
|- 
|- align=center bgcolor="#98fb98"
|style="text-align:left;"|
|2||2||0||0||76||7||+69||6
|-
|- align=center bgcolor="#98fb98"
|style="text-align:left;"|
|2||1||0||1||12||41||–9||4
|- 
|- bgcolor=#ccccff
|style="text-align:left;"|
|2||0||0||2||10||40||–60||2
|- 
|}

Group B

{| class="wikitable" style="text-align: center;"
|-
!width="200"|Team
!width="40"|Pld
!width="40"|W
!width="40"|D
!width="40"|L
!width="40"|PF
!width="40"|PA
!width="40"|+/-
!width="40"|Pts
|- 
|- align=center bgcolor="#98fb98"
|style="text-align:left;"|
|2||2||0||0||86||0||+88||6
|-
|- align=center bgcolor="#98fb98"
|style="text-align:left;"|
|2||1||0||1||17||47||-30||4
|- 
|- bgcolor=#ccccff
|style="text-align:left;"|
|2||0||0||2||0||58||-58||2
|- 
|}

Cup Knockout stage

South America

Group A
{| class="wikitable" style="text-align: center;"
|-
!width="200"|Team
!width="40"|Pld
!width="40"|W
!width="40"|D
!width="40"|L
!width="40"|PF
!width="40"|PA
!width="40"|+/-
!width="40"|Pts
|-
|- align=center bgcolor="#98fb98"
|align=left| 
|3||3||0||0||130||0||+130||9
|-
|- bgcolor=#ccccff
|align=left| 
|3||2||0||1||57||34||+23||7
|-
|- bgcolor=#ccccff
|align=left| 
|3||1||0||2||50||73||-23||5
|-
|- bgcolor="#ffcccc"
|align=left| 
|3||0||0||3||12||142||-130||3
|}

Group B
{| class="wikitable" style="text-align: center;"
|-
!width="200"|Team
!width="40"|Pld
!width="40"|W
!width="40"|D
!width="40"|L
!width="40"|PF
!width="40"|PA
!width="40"|+/-
!width="40"|Pts
|-
|- bgcolor=#ccccff
|align=left| 
|3||3||0||0||128||24||+104||9
|-
|- bgcolor=#ccccff
|align=left| 
|3||2||0||1||36||89||-53||7
|-
|- bgcolor="#ffcccc"
|align=left| 
|3||1||0||2||41||62||-21||5
|-
|- bgcolor="#ffcccc"
|align=left| 
|3||0||0||3||32||62||-30||3
|}

Cup

Asia

Group A

{| class="wikitable" style="text-align: center;"
|-
!width="200"|Team
!width="40"|Pld
!width="40"|W
!width="40"|D
!width="40"|L
!width="40"|PF
!width="40"|PA
!width="40"|+/-
!width="40"|Pts
|- 
|- align=center bgcolor="#98fb98"
|style="text-align:left;"|
|2||2||0||0||72||0||+72||6
|-
|- bgcolor="#ccccff" 
|style="text-align:left;"|
|2||1||0||1||24||41||-17||4
|- 
|- bgcolor="#ffcccc"
|style="text-align:left;"|
|2||0||0||2||0||55||-55||2
|- 
|}

Group B

{| class="wikitable" style="text-align: center;"
|-
!width="200"|Team
!width="40"|Pld
!width="40"|W
!width="40"|D
!width="40"|L
!width="40"|PF
!width="40"|PA
!width="40"|+/-
!width="40"|Pts
|- 
|- align=center bgcolor="#98fb98"
|style="text-align:left;"|
|2||2||0||0||59||12||+47||6  
|-
|- bgcolor="#ccccff" 
|style="text-align:left;"|
|2||1||0||1||38||28||+10||4 
|-
|- bgcolor="#ffcccc" 
|style="text-align:left;"|
|2||0||0||2||12||71||-59||2 
|- 
|}

Group C

{| class="wikitable" style="text-align: center;"
|-
!width="200"|Team
!width="40"|Pld
!width="40"|W
!width="40"|D
!width="40"|L
!width="40"|PF
!width="40"|PA
!width="40"|+/-
!width="40"|Pts
|- 
|- align=center bgcolor="#98fb98"
|style="text-align:left;"|
|2||2||0||0||83||7||+76||6
|-
|- bgcolor="#ccccff" 
|style="text-align:left;"|
|2||1||0||1||54||36||+18||4 
|-
|- bgcolor="#ffcccc" 
|style="text-align:left;"|
|2||0||0||2||7||101||-94||2 
|- 
|}

Group D

{| class="wikitable" style="text-align: center;"
|-
!width="200"|Team
!width="40"|Pld
!width="40"|W
!width="40"|D
!width="40"|L
!width="40"|PF
!width="40"|PA
!width="40"|+/-
!width="40"|Pts
|- align=center bgcolor="#98fb98"
|style="text-align:left;"|
|2||2||0||0||52||19||+33||6 
|-
|- bgcolor="#ccccff" 
|style="text-align:left;"|
|2||1||0||1||50||24||+26||4 
|-
|- bgcolor="#ffcccc" 
|style="text-align:left;"|
|2||0||0||2||12||71||-59||2 
|- 
|}

Bowl

Plate

Cup

Europe

The tournament held in Hannover, Germany on 12 and 13 July 2008, as well as being the European Sevens championship, functioned as a qualifying tournament for the world cup. The five best nations out of the twelve participating ones qualified for the Dubai tournament. Teams finished in the following order:

Oceania

Group A
{| class="wikitable" style="text-align: center;"
|-
!width="200"|Team
!width="40"|Pld
!width="40"|W
!width="40"|D
!width="40"|L
!width="40"|PF
!width="40"|PA
!width="40"|+/-
!width="40"|Pts
|-
|- align=center bgcolor="#98fb98" 
|align=left| 
|3||3||0||0||152||12||+140||9
|-
|- align=center bgcolor="#98fb98"
|align=left| 
|3||2||0||1||41||69||-28||7
|-
|- bgcolor=#ccccff
|align=left| 
|3||1||0||2||50||62||-12||5
|-
|- bgcolor=#ccccff
|align=left| 
|3||0||0||3||17||117||-100||3
|}

Group B
{| class="wikitable" style="text-align: center;"
|-
!width="200"|Team
!width="40"|Pld
!width="40"|W
!width="40"|D
!width="40"|L
!width="40"|PF
!width="40"|PA
!width="40"|+/-
!width="40"|Pts
|-
|- align=center bgcolor="#98fb98"  
|align=left| 
|3||3||0||0||87||12||+75||9
|-
|- align=center bgcolor="#98fb98" 
|align=left| 
|3||2||0||1||81||34||+47||7
|-
|- bgcolor=#ccccff
|align=left| 
|3||1||0||2||32||84||-52||5
|-
|- bgcolor=#ccccff
|align=left| 
|3||0||0||3||19||89||-70||3
|}

Plate

Cup

References

Rugby World Cup Sevens qualification
Qualifying
World Cup Qualifier Sevens